The Victoria Microplate or Victoria Plate is a small tectonic plate in East Africa. It is bounded on all sides by parts of the active East African Rift System. It is currently rotating anticlockwise. Its boundaries are close to those of the mainly Archaean Tanzania Craton, with the two arms of the rift system having propagated along the surrounding Proterozoic shear belts. To the northwest, west and southwest it has a boundary with the Nubian Plate, to the northeast and east with the Somali Plate and to the southeast with the Rovuma Plate.

References

Tectonic plates
Geology of Africa